Quadrula is a genus of freshwater mussels, aquatic bivalve mollusks in the family Unionidae native to rivers of the American Midwest and mid-south.  All have thick nacreous shells with well-developed hinge teeth, many also with  external shell sculpturing of nodules or lumps.

Species within the genus Quadrula
In 2012, many species classified as Quadrula were moved to Rotundaria and Theliderma based on genetic and morphological evidence.
Species currently in Quadrula now consist of:

 Quadrula apiculata (Southern mapleleaf)
 Quadrula fragosa (Winged mapleleaf)
 Quadrula nobilis (Gulf mapleleaf)
 Quadrula quadrula (Mapleleaf)
 Quadrula rumphiana (Ridged mapleleaf)
 Quadrula verrucosa (Pistolgrip)

References

 
Bivalve genera
Molluscs of the United States
Taxonomy articles created by Polbot